The 315th Airlift Wing (315 AW) is a wing of the United States Air Force Reserve.  It is stationed at Joint Base Charleston, in the city of North Charleston, South Carolina, and operates the C-17 Globemaster III aircraft.  If mobilized, the unit would fall under control of Air Mobility Command.

The mission of the 315th Airlift Wing is to provide and deliver global combat-ready airlift, expeditionary combat support and aeromedical evacuation personnel as a source of augmentation for the active forces in any emergency expansion of the Air Force strategic and aeromedical airlift capabilities. Additionally, the Wing performs peacetime missions such as humanitarian airlift as part of the Denton Cargo Program and integrates with the active-duty 437th Airlift Wing and the 628th Air Base Wing in their normal Air Mobility Command operations and logistics missions. Both of these units are assigned to Joint Base Charleston, S.C.

Components
315th Operations Group (315 OG)
300th Airlift Squadron (300 AS)
317th Airlift Squadron (317 AS)
701st Airlift Squadron (701 AS)
315th Aeromedical Evacuation Squadron (315 AES)
315th Airlift Control Flight (315 ACF)
4th Combat Camera Squadron (4 CTCS)

315th Maintenance Group (315 MXG)
315th Maintenance Squadron (315 MXS)
315th Aircraft Maintenance Squadron (315 AMXS)
315th Maintenance Operations Squadron (315 MOS)

315th Mission Support Group (315 MSG)
38th Aerial Port Squadron (38 APS)
53d Aerial Port Squadron (53 APS)
81st Aerial Port Squadron (81 APS)
84th Aerial Port Squadron (84 APS)
315th Mission Support Squadron (315 MSS)
315th Security Forces Squadron (315 SFS)
315th Services Flight (315 SVF)
315th Logistics Readiness Flight (315 LRF)

History

Established as 315 Troop Carrier Wing, Medium, on 23 May 1952 under Far East Air Force in Japan. Activated on 10 Jun 1952.  During the Korean War, the wing flew troop and cargo airlift and airdrop, leaflet drops, spray missions, air evacuation, search and rescue, and other aerial missions in theater as part of Far East Air Forces 315th Air Division.  It remained in the Far East after the war to fly transport missions and paratroop training flights in Japan, Korea, French Indo-China, and other points until December 1954, after which it was again inactivated 18 Jan 1955.

Reactivated in 21 Feb 1966 under Pacific Air Forces, the unit was assigned to Tan Son Nhut Air Base, South Vietnam.  It engaged in special operations directly under Seventh Air Force in Saigon, operating C-123 Provider aircraft with Air Commando squadrons engaging in unconventional warfare. Moved to Phan Rang AB in 1967.  Also operated UC-123 aerial spraying aircraft for Operation Ranch Hand defoliation missions over South Vietnam.  Phased out special operations missions in 1970 and engaged in theater transport missions within South Vietnam. In 1971, became a training organization for Republic of Vietnam Air Force C-123 aircrews.  Inactivated in March 1972.

Reactivated in 1973 as a heavy transport wing in the Air Force Reserve, operating the C-141 Starlifter aircraft, stationed alongside and using the same airframes as the active-duty 437th Airlift Wing at Charleston Air Force Base, South Carolina. It has since trained Air Force Reserve aircrews for strategic airlift, including channel, special assignment, humanitarian, and combat airlift missions.  In the 1980s and 1990s, personnel participated in contingency and humanitarian airlift operations and exercises worldwide.  In 1994, the wing conducted the first C-17 Globemaster III flight with an all-Air Force Reserve crew.  It also took part in the first combined U.S. – Russian exercise that year.  The unit retired its last C-141 in 2001and has flown the C-17 exclusively since.

Lineage
 Established as 315th Troop Carrier Wing, Medium, on 23 May 1952
 Activated on 10 June 1952
 Inactivated on 18 January 1955
 Redesignated 315th Air Commando Wing, Troop Carrier, and activated, on 21 February 1966
 Organized on 8 March 1966
 Redesignated: 315th Air Commando Wing on 1 August 1967
 Redesignated: 315th Special Operations Wing on 1 August 1968
 Redesignated: 315th Tactical Airlift Wing on 1 January 1970
 Inactivated on 31 March 1972
 Redesignated 315th Military Airlift Wing (Associate) on 29 January 1973
 Activated in the Reserve on 1 July 1973
 Redesignated: 315th Airlift Wing (Associate) on 1 February 1992
 Redesignated: 315th Airlift Wing on 1 October 1994

Assignments
 315th Air Division (Combat Cargo), 10 June 1952 – 18 January 1955
 Pacific Air Forces, 21 February 1966
 315th Air Division (Combat Cargo), 8 March 1966
 Attached to 2d Air Division, 8–31 March 1966
 Attached to Seventh Air Force, 1 April-15 October 1966
 834th Air Division, 15 October 1966
 Seventh Air Force, 1 December 1971 – 31 March 1972
 Eastern Air Force Reserve Region, 1 July 1973
 Fourteenth Air Force, 8 October 1976
 Twenty-Second Air Force, 1 July 1993 – September 2011
 Fourth Air Force, September 2011 – present

Components
Groups
 315th Troop Carrier (later, 315 Operations): 10 June 1952 – 18 January 1955; 1 August 1992–present

Squadrons
 8th Special Operations Squadron: 31 July 1971 – 15 January 1972 (detached 5–15 January 1972).
 9th Special Operations Squadron: 30 September 1971 – 29 February 1972 (detached 9 January-29 February 1972)
 12th Air Commando Squadron (later 12 Special Operations Squadron): 15 October 1966 – 30 September 1970
 19th Air Commando Squadron (later 19 Special Operations Squadron): 8 March 1966 – 10 June 1971
 38th Aerial Port Squadron, 1 October 1982 – 1 August 1992
 300th Military Airlift Squadron (later 300th Airlift Squadron): 1 July 1973 – 1 August 1992
 309th Air Commando Squadron (later 309th Special Operations Squadron, 309th Tactical Airlift Squadron): 8 March 1966 – 31 July 1970
 310th Air Commando Squadron (later 310th Special Operations Squadron, 310th Tactical Airlift Squadron): 8 March 1966 – 15 January 1972, attached 16–26 January 1972
 311th Air Commando Squadron (later 311th Special Operations Squadron, 311th Tactical Airlift Squadron): 8 March 1966 – 5 October 1971
 317th Airlift Squadron: 1 April-1 August 1992
 701st Military Airlift Squadron (later 701st Airlift Squadron): 1 July 1973 – 1 August 1992
 707th Military Airlift Squadron (later 707th Airlift Squadron): 1 July 1973 – 1 August 1992

Stations
 Brady AB, Japan, 10 June 1952 – 18 January 1955
 Tan Son Nhut AB, South Vietnam, 8 March 1966
 Phan Rang AB, South Vietnam, 15 June 1967 – 31 March 1972
 Charleston AFB, South Carolina, 1 July 1973 – 7 January 2010
 Joint Base Charleston, South Carolina, 8 January 2010 – present

Aircraft

C-46 Commando (1952–1955)
UC-123 (1966–1971)
C-123 Provider (1966–1972)
A-37 Dragonfly (1971–1972)
O-2 Skymaster (1971–1972)
C-141 Starlifter (1973–2000)
C-17 Globemaster III (1993 – present)

Operations
World War II
Korean War
Vietnam War
Operation Urgent Fury
Operation Just Cause
Operation Noble Eagle
Operation Enduring Freedom
Operation Iraqi Freedom
Operation New Dawn

Unit shields

References

External links
 315 AW Home Page
 

Military units and formations in South Carolina
0315